Luciano Montero Hernández (20 April 1908 – 1 August 1993) was a Spanish professional road bicycle racer. He is most known for his silver medal in the Elite race of the 1935 UCI Road World Championships.

Major results 

1926
 1st Trophée France-Sport
1927
 1st GP Pascuas
1928
 1st GP Pascuas
 4th Overall Tour de la Sud-Ouest
1st Stage 1
1929
 1st  National Road Race Championships
 1st GP UVE
1930
 1st GP de la Bicicleta Eibarresa
 1st Vuelta a Alava
 1st Trofeo Olimpia
 2nd National Road Race Championships
 9th Overall Tour of the Basque Country
1931
 1st Prueba Loinaz
 3rd Prueba Legazpia
1932
 1st  National Road Race Championships
 1st GP República
 1st GP Valladolid
1933
 1st GP de l'Echo d'Alger
 1st GP República
 1st Prueba Legazpia
 1st Stage 4 Volta a Galicia
 2nd National Road Race Championships
 7th Grand Prix des Nations
1934
 1st  National Road Race Championships
 1st GP Vizcaya
 1st GP República
 3rd Grand Prix des Nations
1935
 2nd  Road race, World Road Championships
 3rd National Road Race Championships
 3rd Grand Prix des Nations
1936
 2nd National Road Race Championships
 3rd Grand Prix des Nations
 10th Road race, World Road Championships
1938
 1st Bordeaux-Angoulème

References

1908 births
1993 deaths
Spanish male cyclists
Sportspeople from the Province of Ávila
Cyclists from Castile and León
Cyclists from the Basque Country (autonomous community)
Sportspeople from Gipuzkoa
People from Ordizia